Eliakim Hastings Moore (June 19, 1812 – April 4, 1900) was an American politician who served one term as a U.S. Representative from Ohio from 1869 to 1871.

Biography 
Moore was born to David & Dolly (Hastings) Moore in Boylston, Massachusetts, and moved with his parents to Marietta, Ohio and in 1817 to Athens County, Ohio. He attended the common schools, and later educated himself at night as a civil engineer.

Moore served as County surveyor from 1836-1846, and later as Auditor for Athens County from 1846-1860. He served as collector of internal revenue for the Marietta-Athens district of Ohio from 1862-1866, later organizing the First National Bank of Athens in 1863 and was connected therewith as president and director until about 1895.

Moore was elected as a Republican to the Forty-first Congress (March 4, 1869 – March 3, 1871), but was not a candidate for renomination in 1870. After politics, he engaged in railroad enterprises in Athens, Ohio, as well as being a Trustee of Ohio University at Athens.

Moore died in Athens April 4, 1900, and was interred in West Union Street Cemetery.

The mathematician E. H. Moore was his grandson.

Sources

External links
 Descendants of Thomas Hastings website
 Descendants of Thomas Hastings on Facebook

1812 births
1900 deaths
People from Athens, Ohio
People from Boylston, Massachusetts
Ohio University trustees
19th-century American politicians
Republican Party members of the United States House of Representatives from Ohio